Vitesco Technologies Group AG (known until autumn 2019 as Continental Powertrain), headquartered in Regensburg, is a German automotive supplier for drivetrain and powertrain technologies. Vitesco Technologies was a business area of Continental AG until it became independent in September 2021. The company develops devices for electric drive as well as internal combustion engines.

History 
On January 1, 2019, Continental Powertrain was carved out from the Continental AG. The brand name was changed from Continental Powertrain to Vitesco Technologies. The new name was officially introduced on October 1, 2019.

On September 16, 2021, Vitesco Technologies became independent from Continental and was listed on the Frankfurt Stock Exchange.

Company Structure 
Vitesco Technologies was founded to act as a more independent and entrepreneurially flexible company. Andreas Wolf had headed Continental's Powertrain division since 2018 and became CEO of Vitesco Technologies after the demerger.

Vitesco Technologies has three business units which act economically independent:

 Electronic Controls
 Electrification Technology
 Sensing & Actuation

Products 
The company develops components for hybrid electric, electric drive and combustion engines. The product portfolio includes electric drives, electronic control units, sensors and actuators, as well as exhaust management devices.

The products of Vitesco Technologies include electric drives, from 48-volt-systems and hybrid technologies to high-voltage components. In 2019, the company introduced their 48-volt-high-power drive with an output of 30 kW. The 48-volt-hybrid component, consisting of an electric machine with integrated power electronics as well as a battery, has comparable functions to a high-voltage electric machine; however it is more compact, lighter and cheaper to produce while having the same efficiency.  In the high-voltage segment, Vitesco Technologies offers an axle drive with two power outputs, 120 or 150 kW. The high-voltage axle drive combines the electric engine, power electronics and reduction gear in one. Because of its size and efficiency, it is suitable for numerous vehicles and concepts.

Power electronics, which control the cooperation between the electric machine and the battery, are another part of the product portfolio. Vitesco Technologies supplies various types of electronic vehicles with power electronics: from plug-in hybrids and electric cars with highly integrated axle drives to electric high-performance vehicles. The integrated power module allows a current of up to 650 amperes and provides the electric machine with energy and controls the energy recovery.

References 

Continental AG
German companies established in 2019
Auto parts suppliers of Germany